Willow Grove station is a station on the SEPTA Warminster Line, located in Willow Grove, Pennsylvania. The station, located on York Road (PA 611) and Davisville Roads, features a 190-space parking lot. Willow Grove station was originally built in 1886 by the Reading Railroad, and replaced by a stone structure built in 1939. The station house was closed in 1965, but continues to serve passengers.

Description
Willow Grove station consists of a side platform along the tracks. The station has a ticket office and waiting room that is open on weekday mornings. There are two bike racks available that can hold up to four bicycles. Willow Grove station has a daily parking lot with 116 spaces that charges $1 a day, a permit parking lot with 32 spaces that charges $20 a month, and a daily parking lot with 42 spaces that charges 50 cents a day.

Train service at Willow Grove station is provided along the Warminster Line of SEPTA Regional Rail, which runs south to Center City Philadelphia and north to its terminus at Warminster. Willow Grove station is located in fare zone 3. Service is provided daily from early morning to late evening. Most Warminster Line trains continue through the Center City Commuter Connection tunnel and become Airport Line trains, providing service to the Philadelphia International Airport. In FY 2013, Willow Grove station had a weekday average of 472 boardings and 515 alightings.

Amenities 
The Willow Grove station has a ticket office which is only open on weekdays from 5:15 AM to 11:45 AM. Several benches for sitting on while people wait for the train to come are also available, all of them under a canopy-type roof so that people do not get wet on rainy days.

Schedules 
Trains going to Center City Philadelphia arrive at the Willow Grove station about every 30 minutes on weekdays (every hour on weekends and major holidays), and trains headed towards Warminster station arrive every hour on all days, including weekdays, weekends, and holidays. Half past every hour on weekdays a train headed towards Warminster operates, but terminates at Glenside station instead of continuing all the way to Warminster like the trains that operate every :00 on weekdays do.

Fares 
On weekdays between 5:15 am and 11:45 am, commuters can buy and/or reload a SEPTA Key Card to ride the train inside the station's ticket office, but on weekends and weekday afternoons, tickets must be purchased from the train conductor or Key Card Fares must be loaded on the SEPTA Key Website  or at an Exit Fare Kiosk in Center City upon departure of Willow Grove station. Passengers buying their ticket on board the train may pay for their ticket with cash or credit card . SEPTA Key Card fares purchased in advance also cost less than tickets purchased from the conductor on board the train.

Station layout

Gallery

References

External links

SEPTA - Willow Grove Station
Original Willow Grove Reading Railroad Station
 Station from York Road from Google Maps Street View

SEPTA Regional Rail stations
Stations on the Warminster Line
Former Reading Company stations
Railway stations in the United States opened in 1886
Railway stations in Montgomery County, Pennsylvania